Endre Kabos (5 November 1906 – 4 November 1944) was a Hungarian sabre fencer. He competed individually and with the team at the 1932 and 1936 Olympics and won three gold and one bronze medals.

Kabos was noticed internationally after winning the Slovakian Championships in 1928. He then collected six gold and one silver medals in sabre at the European Championships in 1930–1935.

Kabos was Jewish. During World War II he was interned for five months in a forced labor camp in Vax, Hungary. He was called up in June 1944 to work at labour camps for Jews at the village of Felsöhangony, where he was teaching army officers the use of sabre fencing. Later he was transferred to Budapest and was given two horses and a cart to transport food and provisions for others in camp. On 4 November, the day before his 38th birthday, he was driving on Margaret Bridge while German soldiers were preparing explosives to blow up the bridge prior to it being used by the advancing Red Army which at that time was about 150 kilometers to the East of Budapest. Kabos died with many others and only some non-identifiable skeleton parts were found in 2011, when the bridge was being extended.

Kabos was inducted into the International Jewish Sports Hall of Fame in 1986.

See also
 List of select Jewish fencers

References

External links
 Jewish Sports bio
 Jews in Sports bio
 
 
 Photo in Holocaust Museum
 Hungarian bio
 Endre Kabos at Jewish.hu's list of famous Hungarian Jews

1906 births
1944 deaths
Hungarian male sabre fencers
Jewish male sabre fencers
Jewish Hungarian sportspeople
Olympic fencers of Hungary
Fencers at the 1932 Summer Olympics
Fencers at the 1936 Summer Olympics
Olympic gold medalists for Hungary
Olympic bronze medalists for Hungary
Olympic medalists in fencing
International Jewish Sports Hall of Fame inductees
Medalists at the 1932 Summer Olympics
Medalists at the 1936 Summer Olympics
Hungarian civilians killed in World War II
Hungarian World War II forced labourers